The following is a list of public monuments in Bishkek, the capital of Kyrgyzstan.

Monuments in Bishkek

See also
 Culture of Kyrgyzstan
 Ministry of Culture, Information and Tourism (Kyrgyz Republic)
 Tourism in Kyrgyzstan

References

Bishkek